

Historical or architectural interest bridges

Major bridges

References 
 Nicolas Janberg, Structurae.com, International Database for Civil and Structural Engineering

 Others references

See also 

 Transport in Egypt

Further reading 

Egypt

b
Bridges